The Colegiata de Santa Maria la Mayor, in translation, the Collegiate church of St Mary Major is a mudéjar-gothic style, Roman Catholic church located in Calatayud, in Aragon, Spain.

History
The church was commissioned in the 12th century after the Reconquista of Calatayud by King Alfonso I el Batallador. This church was sited where the main mosque of the town was located.  
 
The church assumed a historical position in that it hosted some of the meetings of the Cortes de Calatayud during the reign of King Pedro IV of Aragon, and where the town swore allegiance to Emperor Charles I and  later to King Philip III of Spain. The church was declared Bien de Interés Cultural in 1884.

Art and architecture
Of the original mudéjar-gothic construction, the church retains the cloister, tower and apse. In the 16th century the portal was sculpted in alabaster by Juan de Talavera and Esteban de Obray.

In 1884, the church was declared Monumento Nacional, and the main portal was surrounded by a gate.

In 2001, the UNESCO recognized it as a World Heritage, within the Mudéjar Architecture of Aragon Site.

Torre de Santa María
The 70 meter brick tower of octagonal base, and like most such towers, the decoration increases as one rises. Construction took centuries. At the base, the walls are 1.5 meters in thickness. The stairwell spirals upward between an inner and outer wall. The spire atop the bellower was built in the mid- to late 18th century.

See also 
 List of Bien de Interés Cultural in the Province of Zaragoza

References 

Roman Catholic churches in Calatayud
Colegiata de Santa Maria la Mayor
Colegiata de Santa Maria la Mayor
Colegiata de Santa Maria la Mayor
Colegiata de Santa Maria la Mayor
World Heritage Sites in Spain